The 2003 Kärcher Canadian Junior Curling Championships were held February 1–9 at the Rideau and Ottawa Curling Clubs in Ottawa. Teams from Saskatoon, Saskatchewan won both the men's and women's event. Both teams would go on to win gold medals for Canada at the 2003 World Junior Curling Championships. The men's event was won by the Steve Laycock rink from the Sutherland Curling Club, while the women's event was won by the Marliese Miller (now Kasner) rink from the Nutana Curling Club.

Men's

Teams

Standings

Results
Draw 1

Draw 2

Draw 3

Draw 4

Draw 5

Draw 6

Draw 7

Draw 8

Draw 9

Draw 10

Draw 11

Draw 12

Draw 13

Draw 14

Draw 15

Draw 16

Draw 17

Draw 18

Playoffs

Tiebreaker

Semifinal

Final

Women's

Teams

Standings

Results
Draw 1

Draw 2

Draw 3

Draw 4

Draw 5

Draw 6

Draw 7

Draw 8

Draw 9

Draw 10

Draw 11

Draw 12

Draw 13

Draw 14

Draw 15

Draw 16

Draw 17

Draw 18

Playoffs

Tiebreaker #1

Tiebreaker #2

Semifinal

Final

Qualification

Ontario
The Teranet Ontario Junior Curling Championships were held January 7-12 at the Brant Curling Club in Brantford.

Stephanie Gray defeated Lee Merklinger from the Granite Curling Club of West Ottawa in the women's final. 

In the men's final, Mark Bice of the Sarnia Curling Club defeated Chris Ciasnocha of the Rideau Curling Club 7-5.

External links
Archived Statistics – Men
Archived Statistics – Women

References

Canadian Junior Curling Championships
Curling in Ottawa
2003 in Ontario
Canadian Junior Curling Championships
2000s in Ottawa
February 2003 sports events in Canada